The 2023 Jeddah FIA Formula 2 round was a motor racing event held between 17 and 19 March 2023 at the Jeddah Corniche Circuit. It was the second round of the 2023 FIA Formula 2 Championship and was held in support of the 2023 Saudi Arabian Grand Prix.

Report

Championship standings before the round

After winning the Feature Race in Bahrain quite dominantly, Théo Pourchaire entered the round as the championship leader with 32 points, with current runner-up Ralph Boschung only being four points adrift from the Frenchman. Carlin driver and rookie Zane Maloney was ranked third with 15 points.

Campos Racing entered the round as the Teams' Championship leader by scoring a total of 42 points, with ART Grand Prix being four points behind the Spanish team in second, while MP Motorsport as the reigning Teams' Champion currently was ranked sixth with eleven points.

Qualifying 
After a dominant qualiying session in Sakhir two weeks ago, ART Grand Prix drew all the attention at the grid whether the French team could once again dominate qualifying – they did this time with Victor Martins, who took pole position by 0.744 seconds ahead of Oliver Bearman. Championship leader Pourchaire, who took pole position in Sakhir, qualified in third, while rookie driver Jak Crawford took reverse grid pole after qualifying tenth.

Sprint Race 
All 22 drivers came through the first corners at the start, with Jak Crawford maintaining the lead into the first lap ahead of fellow Red Bull Junior Team driver Ayumu Iwasa, who overtook Boschung into turn 1. Just one lap later, Iwasa would hold on to overtake Crawford to become the leader of the Sprint Race, before a spin from Zane Maloney – another Red Bull Junior – caused the first Safety Car period of the race. Iwasa and Boschung initially were able to build a gap to the rest of the grid, before the Safety Car once again was deployed after an avoidable collision between Théo Pourchaire and Oliver Bearman into turn 1, forcing both drivers to retire from the race with terminal damage. In an intense second half of the race, Iwasa hung on to win the Sprint Race ahead of Victor Martins, who charged through the field after starting in tenth, and Jehan Daruvala. Boschung, Iwasa, Vesti, Doohan and Hauger took the final points positions.

Feature Race 
Polesitter Victor Martins immediately lost the lead at the start to Prema's Oliver Bearman, whilst his teammate Frederik Vesti even managed to progress himself to fourth position after starting in P8. Similar to the Sprint Race the previous day, the first retirement occurred on lap 2 when Brad Benavides collided with Amaury Cordeel on the approach to turn 1, forcing Benavides to retire and Cordeel to come into the pits to change his damaged front wing. Meanwhile, Martins and Bearman, who competed against each other for the F3 title last year, battled against each other for the race lead after completing their respective mandatory pitstop, with Vesti and Doohan hanging on their tails in third and fourth respectively. Martins subsequently took the lead from the Brit on lap 11, while Vesti took benefit and managed to get past Bearman for second place. However, unforseen events took overhand when Bearman and Martins spun out of contention on lap 16 and 18 respectively. Bearman was able to continue but dropped down to P10, whereas Martins was forced to retire after stalling the engine in his second consecutive Feature Race, resulting in Vesti to take the lead of the race ahead of Doohan. The Danish driver ultimately claimed his first Feature Race win in Formula 2 ahead of the Australian driver, whilst Jehan Daruvala once again drove to the podium by finishing in third ahead of previous winner Iwasa. Dennis Hauger finished in the top 5 by making the alternative strategy work such as Richard Verschoor after starting from P20, Enzo Fittipaldi, Arthur Leclerc and Isack Hadjar. After his spin midway through the race, Bearman was able to take his first point in Formula 2 by finishing tenth. However, Théo Pourchaire who entered the round as the championship leader, lost his lead to Ralph Boschung after scoring no points during the weekend, with the latter leading the championship for the first time in his career.

Classification

Qualifying 

Notes
 – Frederik Vesti received a five-place grid drop for causing a collision with Richard Verschoor in the Sakhir Feature Race. The penalty will apply to the next race that the Dane participates in.
 – Clément Novalak and Roman Staněk have received five-place grid penalties for Saturday's Sprint Race after Trident mechanics were found to have failed to hand back both drivers’ set of tyres into parc fermé. Team personnel were also found to have worked on the sets of tyres before handing them in, breaching the Sporting Regulations, dropping down both drivers to P16 and P21 respectively.

Sprint race

Feature Race 

Notes:
 – Prior to the Feature Race, Théo Pourchaire received a five-place grid penalty for causing an avoidable collision with Oliver Bearman during Saturday's Sprint Race.

Standings after the event 

Drivers' Championship standings

Teams' Championship standings

 Note: Only the top five positions are included for both sets of standings.

See also 
 2023 Saudi Arabian Grand Prix

References

External links 
 Official website

Jeddah
2023 in Saudi Arabian sport
Jeddah